The 2021 New Orleans Bowl was a college football bowl game played on December 18, 2021, with kickoff at 9:15 p.m. EST (8:15 p.m. local CST) and broadcast on ESPN. It was the 21st edition of the New Orleans Bowl, and was one of the 2021–22 bowl games concluding the 2021 FBS football season. Sponsored by freight shipping company R+L Carriers, the game was officially known as the R+L Carriers New Orleans Bowl.

Teams
The bowl matched Louisiana of the Sun Belt Conference against Marshall of Conference USA (C-USA). This was the first meeting of the two programs. Marshall previously announced that they plan to join the Sun Belt for the 2023 season.

Louisiana

The Cajuns (12–1, 8–0 in Sun Belt play) entered the contest with a 12-game win streak, ranked 23rd in the nation, two consecutive bowl victories (2020 LendingTree and 2020 First Responder), four consecutive divisional championship, two consecutive conference championship, and a new head coach in Michael Desormeaux following Billy Napier's sudden departure to Florida. This was the Cajuns sixth time in the New Orleans Bowl (2011–2014, 2015), with an overall record of 2–1 following two vacated victories in the 2011 and 2013 matchups. The Cajuns' overall bowl record was 7–3, with its most recent bowl game, the 2020 First Responder Bowl, resulting in a win over UTSA.

Marshall

The Thundering Herd finished the 2021 regular season with a 7–5 (5–3 C-USA) record to finish in a tie for second place in the East Division. This game was the team's first appearance in the New Orleans Bowl and 18th overall bowl. This was Marshall's first bowl game against a team from the Sun Belt Conference since the 2011 Beef 'O' Brady's Bowl, a win over FIU.

Game summary

Statistics

References

External links
 Game statistics at statbroadcast.com

New Orleans Bowl
New Orleans Bowl
Louisiana Ragin' Cajuns football bowl games
Marshall Thundering Herd football bowl games
New Orleans Bowl
New Orleans Bowl